Mercury(I) bromide or mercurous bromide is the chemical compound composed of mercury and bromine with the formula Hg2Br2. It changes color from white to yellow when heated and fluoresces a salmon color when exposed to ultraviolet light. It has applications in acousto-optical devices.

A very rare mineral form is called kuzminite and has the chemical formula .

Reactions
Mercury(I) bromide is prepared by the oxidation of elemental mercury with elemental bromine or by adding sodium bromide to a solution of mercury(I) nitrate. It decomposes to mercury(II) bromide and elemental mercury.

Structure
In common with other Hg(I) (mercurous) compounds which contain linear X-Hg-Hg-X units, Hg2Br2 contains linear BrHg2Br units with an Hg-Hg bond length of 249 pm (Hg-Hg in the metal is 300 pm) and an Hg-Br bond length of 271 pm.  The overall coordination of each Hg atom is octahedral as, in addition to the two nearest neighbours, there are four other Br atoms at 332 pm. The compound is often formulated as Hg22+ 2Br−, although it is actually a molecular compound.

References

Mercury(I) compounds
Bromides
Metal halides